South Cimahi is a district of Cimahi, West Java, Indonesia. South Cimahi had a population of 238,792 in 2014.

Villages 
South Cimahi is divided into five villages:

References 

Districts of Cimahi